Dehlco is an unincorporated community in Richland Parish, Louisiana, United States. The community is located   S. of Rayville, Louisiana.

References

Unincorporated communities in Richland Parish, Louisiana
Unincorporated communities in Louisiana